443 Queen Street is a residential skyscraper under construction at 443 Queen Street, Brisbane, Australia. The site is the last riverfront location in the Brisbane central business district. The 47 storey tower will include 106 one bedroom, 106 two bedroom and 54 four bedroom  apartments. All 264 apartments will have views of the Brisbane River. Due to its unique design the tower is described as a high rise Queenslander.

A development application for the project was lodged with the Brisbane City Council in October 2015. The University of Queensland, that owned the adjoining Customs House, unsuccessfully appealed the approval.

Demolition of the former office building commenced in October 2017, with construction of the footings for the new building commencing in May 2018.

Construction was suspended in February 2022 after contractor Probuild was placed in administration. It will be completed by Hutchinson Builders.

References

External links
Building at The Skyscraper Center database 

Residential skyscrapers in Australia
Queen Street, Brisbane